Veronica mannii is a species of flowering plant in the family Plantaginaceae. It is found in Cameroon and Equatorial Guinea. Its natural habitat is subtropical or tropical dry lowland grassland.

References

mannii
Flora of Africa
Near threatened plants
Taxonomy articles created by Polbot